Milton Bluehouse Sr. (February 29, 1936 – January 14, 2019) was the fourth president of the Navajo Nation in the post-Restructuring of the tribal government.

Early life 
Bluehouse was born in Ganado, Arizona. He served in the United States Army for three years. Bluehouse served on the Navajo Tribal Council. He also served as the vice-president in the office of his predecessor Thomas Atcitty. He assumed the presidency after some controversy involving his right to be president. As he had been an appointed vice-president, the law stated that he was not eligible to become president. The law was changed to allow him to assume the presidency.

References

External links
 List of Navajo Nation leaders

1936 births
2019 deaths
People from Ganado, Arizona
Military personnel from Arizona
Members of the Navajo Nation Council
Presidents of the Navajo Nation
Vice Presidents of the Navajo Nation
20th-century Native Americans
21st-century Native Americans
Native American people from Arizona